is a Japanese football player currently playing for Sanfrecce Hiroshima.

Career statistics
Updated to end of 2018 season.

1Includes Japanese Super Cup, J.League Championship and FIFA Club World Cup.

Honours
J1 League
 Champions (1): 2015
J1 League Second stage
 Champions (1): 2015J.League Cup Champions (1): 2022Japanese Super Cup: Winners (2):''' 2014, 2016

References

External links
Profile at JEF United Chiba

Profile at Sanfrecce Hiroshima

1991 births
Living people
Tokyo Gakugei University alumni
Association football people from Hiroshima Prefecture
Japanese footballers
J1 League players
J2 League players
Sanfrecce Hiroshima players
JEF United Chiba players
Association football midfielders
Universiade bronze medalists for Japan
Universiade medalists in football
Medalists at the 2013 Summer Universiade
21st-century Japanese people